The Kingston Frontenacs are a junior ice hockey team in the Ontario Hockey League, based in Kingston, Ontario, Canada. The Frontenacs play home games at Leon's Centre, which opened in 2008.

Team history predates the OHA, back to 1945, to a team known as the Kingston Victorias. This franchise was founded in the OHA in 1973–74, then known as the Kingston Canadians until 1987–88. The team was briefly known as the Kingston Raiders in 1988–89, and as the Frontenacs ever since.

History

The original Kingston Frontenacs were founded in 1897, named after Louis de Buade de Frontenac, governor of New France, who established Fort Frontenac on the site of present-day Kingston. The original Frontenacs were coached by James T. Sutherland, played in the intermediate division of the Ontario Hockey Association (OHA), and won the inaugural J. Ross Robertson Cup during the 1898–99 season.

The Kingston Frontenacs had a junior ice hockey team in the OHA prior to World War I. This version of the Frontenacs won the J. Ross Robertson Cup in the 1910–11 season. National Hockey League alumni from this team are Alec Connell, Bill Cook, Allan Davidson and Flat Walsh.

An Ontario Hockey Association (OHA) Sr. League team also existed from the 1910s to 1940s. National Hockey League alumni from this team are Mickey Blake, Glen Brydson, Bill Cook, Gus Giesebrecht, Doug Stevenson, Charles Stewart, Carl Voss and Flat Walsh. Some members of this team then formed an entry in the Ontario Veteran's Hockey League during World War II. National Hockey League alumni from this team are Hub Macey, Gus Marker, Walt McCartney and Ed Nicholson.

1952–1973

In 1952, the Kingston Victoria were renamed the Kingston Frontenacs. This team played at the Junior B level, then later at the Junior A level. This Frontenacs team lost in the 1963 Sutherland Cup final to the St. Marys Lincolns, 4 games to 1.

From 1959 to 1963, there was also a Kingston Frontenacs team in the Eastern Professional Hockey League.

Kingston Canadians (1973–1988)
The Kingston Canadians arrival in the Ontario Hockey Association (OHA) for the 1973–74 season, was a result of the Montreal Junior Canadiens switch to the Quebec Major Junior Hockey League (QMJHL) in 1972. During the summer of 1972, the QMJHL had threatened a lawsuit against the OHA to force the Junior Canadiens to return to the Quebec-based league. To solve the problem, the OHA granted the Junior Canadiens franchise a "one-year suspension" of operations, while team ownership transferred the team and players into the QMJHL, renaming themselves the Montreal Bleu Blanc Rouge in the process.

After a one-year hiatus, the OHA then reactivated the suspended franchise under new ownership and with new players, calling the team the Kingston Canadians. The new Kingston team was essentially an expansion franchise promoted from the OHA's Tier II league, that had only common name to share with the old Junior Canadiens. The Tier II Frontenacs originated in the Eastern Junior B Hockey League and date back to at least the early 1940s as the Kingston Victorias. However, in some OHA histories (such as the annual Media Guide) the Kingston team is still shown as the legitimate successors of the Junior Canadiens' legacy.

Kingston Raiders (1988–89)
Following a change in ownership the club was renamed Kingston Raiders for one season in 1988–89. Due to ownership problems, the team was sold again following that season.

Kingston Frontenacs (1989–present)
In 1989, the new ownership, including Wren Blair, Don Anderson and Bob Attersley, renamed the team Kingston Frontenacs after the Eastern Professional Hockey League team. The Boston Bruins-style uniforms and logos were revived from the old franchise. The city embraced and welcomed the new ownership. Wren Blair and Bob Attersley were both hockey legends in their own right. In 1997 Wren Blair would be honoured with the Bill Long Award for distinguished service in the OHL.  The club was sold to the Springer family of Kingston in June 1998, with Doug Springer becoming the owner and governor.

The Frontenacs franchise has the second-longest championship drought in the OHL (to the Sudbury Wolves by one year), and the fourth-longest in the Canadian Hockey League. The Frontenacs won the Leyden Trophy as the OHL's East Division champions in the 1994–95 and 2015–16. In the 1992–93 season, the Frontenacs reached the Eastern Conference Final but lost to the Peterborough Petes. In 2017-18, Kingston reached the Eastern Conference final for the second time in club history, however, they lost to the Hamilton Bulldogs.

Coaches

During the inaugural season of the Kingston Canadians in 1973–74, Jack Bownass was awarded the Matt Leyden Trophy as OHA Coach of the Year. Former NHL defenceman Jim Morrison coached the team from 1975 to 1982, which was the longest stint a coach had when the club was known as the Canadians.

Larry Mavety coached the Frontenacs for much of the team's history. He originally coached the team in 1988–89, when they were still known as the Kingston Raiders. In 1989–90, the first season the franchise was known as the Frontenacs, he won the Matt Leyden Trophy as the OHL Coach of the Year. Mavety returned to Kingston in 1997 to become the head coach once again, and stayed in that position until midway through the 2002–03 season when he stepped down to focus on his general manager duties. After a slow start in the 2007–08 season, Mavety once again found himself coaching the Frontenacs until November 2008. Mavety remained as the general manager until the end of the 2010–11 season.

The Frontenacs had head coaches that were also head coaches in the National Hockey League, including Dave Allison,  Gary Agnew, and Bruce Cassidy.

List of coaches
(Multiple years in parentheses, totals include all incarnations of the Kingston franchise)

Players
Paul Coffey is the only former member of the Kingston franchise to be inducted into the Hockey Hall of Fame, getting the honour in 2004. In 1977–78, Coffey played for the Kingston Canadians, as a late season addition from the North York Rangers. He played eight regular season games and five playoff games with the Canadians.

Honoured numbers
Ten numbers have been "honoured" from the Kingston Canadians/Frontenacs.  They are not retired and remain in use. (#5 Mike O'Connell, #7 Tony McKegney, #10 Brad Rhiness, #14 Ken Linseman, #17 David Ling, #7 Mike Zigomanis, #88 Keli Corpse, #29 Chris Clifford, #13 Anthony Stewart, #24 Chris Stewart)

Larry Mavety is the only builder to be honoured by the organization for his work as a coach and general manager. The coach/gm holds the Kingston Frontenacs Hockey Clubs all-time wins record with 243.

Award winners

Team captains

First round draft picks
The Kingston franchise has had several players selected in the first round of the NHL draft.
Alex Forsyth – 18th overall, Washington Capitals, 1975 Draft
Mark Suzor – 17th overall, Philadelphia Flyers, 1976 Draft
Mike Crombeen – 5th overall, Cleveland Barons, 1977 Draft
Mike Gillis – 5th overall, Colorado Rockies, 1978 Draft
Behn Wilson – 6th overall, Philadelphia Flyers, 1978 Draft
Ken Linseman – 7th overall, Philadelphia Flyers, 1978 Draft
Jay Wells – 16th overall, Los Angeles Kings, 1979 Draft
Rik Wilson – 12th overall, St. Louis Blues, 1980 Draft
Mike Stothers – 21st overall, Philadelphia Flyers, 1980 Draft
Kirk Muller – 2nd overall, New Jersey Devils, 1984 Draft
Roger Belanger – 16th overall, Pittsburgh Penguins, 1984 Draft
Scott Metcalfe – 20th overall, Edmonton Oilers, 1985 Draft
Bryan Fogarty – 9th overall, Quebec Nordiques, 1987 Draft
Scott Pearson – 6th overall, Toronto Maple Leafs, 1988 Draft
Drake Berehowsky – 10th overall, Toronto Maple Leafs, 1990 Draft
Chris Gratton – 3rd overall, Tampa Bay Lightning, 1993 Draft
Brett Lindros – 9th overall, New York Islanders, 1994 Draft
Chad Kilger – 4th overall, Mighty Ducks of Anaheim, 1995 Draft
Kevin Grimes – 26th overall, Colorado Avalanche, 1997 Draft
Anthony Stewart – 25th overall, Florida Panthers, 2003 Draft
Chris Stewart – 18th overall, Colorado Avalanche, 2006 Draft
Erik Gudbranson - 3rd overall, Florida Panthers, 2010 Draft
Sam Bennett - 4th overall, Calgary Flames, 2014 Draft
Lawson Crouse - 11th overall, Florida Panthers, 2015 Draft
Shane Wright - 4th overall, Seattle Kraken, 2022 Draft

NHL alumni
Kingston Canadians

Perry Anderson
Scott Arniel
Roger Belanger
Neil Belland
Phil Bourque
Gord Buynak
Jeff Chychrun
Chris Clifford
Paul Coffey
Mike Crombeen
Peter Dineen
Brian Dobbin
Peter Driscoll
Richie Dunn
Todd Elik
Bryan Fogarty
Mike Forbes
Alex Forsyth
Mike Gillis
Ron Handy
Greg Holst
Greg Hotham
Scott Howson
Tim Kerr
Marc Laforge
Ken Linseman
Darren Lowe
Tom McCarthy
Tony McKegney
Scott Metcalfe
Mike Moffat
Kirk Muller
Craig Muni
Bernie Nicholls
Mike O'Connell
Scott Pearson
Rob Plumb
Walt Poddubny
Paul Pooley
Herb Raglan
Moe Robinson
Howard Scruton
Steve Seftel
Steve Seguin
Mike Siltala
Dennis Smith
Mike Stothers
Mark Suzor
Jay Wells
Behn Wilson
Rik Wilson

Kingston Raiders

Drake Berehowsky
Tony Cimellaro
Sean Gauthier
Mark Major
Scott Pearson
Jason Simon

Kingston Frontenacs

Chris Allen
Sean Avery
Sam Bennett
Chris Beckford-Tseu
Drake Berehowsky
Matt Bradley
Jan Bulis
Tony Cimellaro
Matt Cooke
Lawson Crouse
Michael Dal Colle
Sean Day
Patrick DesRochers
Matt Elich
Cory Emmerton
Drew Fata
Warren Foegele
Sean Gauthier
Chris Gratton
Josh Gratton
Philipp Grubauer
Erik Gudbranson
Max Jones
Chad Kilger
Nathan LaFayette
Juho Lammikko
Marc Lamothe
Brian Lashoff
Brett Lindros
David Ling
Mark Major
Evan McEneny
Roland McKeown
Sean McMorrow
Jason Morgan
Marc Moro
Tyler Moss
Shane O'Brien
Alan Quine
Andrew Raycroft
Craig Rivet
Jason Robertson
Bryan Rodney
Radek Smolenak
Mike Smith
Ryan Spooner
Anthony Stewart
Chris Stewart
Daniel Taylor
Gabriel Vilardi
Michael Zigomanis

Season-by-season results

Regular season
 Kingston Frontenacs 1960–73 (EJBHL & OPJHL)
 Kingston Canadians 1973–88
 Kingston Raiders 1988–89
 Kingston Frontenacs 1989–present

Legend: OTL = Overtime loss, SL = Shoot Out Loss

Playoffs
Junior B Era
1953–54 Won Eastern Jr. B championshipLost Sutherland Cup semi-final round robin
1955–56 Won Eastern Jr. B championshipLost Sutherland Cup semi-final round robin
1962–63 Won Eastern Jr. B championshipDefeated Lakeshore Bruins in Sutherland Cup quarter-final 3-games-to-2Defeated Burlington Cougars in Sutherland Cup semi-final 3-games-to-noneLost Sutherland Cup final to St. Marys Lincolns 4-games-to-1
1963–64 Won Eastern Jr. B championshipDefeated Burlington Cougars in Sutherland Cup quarter-final 4-games-to-1Lost Sutherland Cup semi-final to Weston Dukes 4-games-to-none
1964–65 Won Eastern Jr. B championshipLost Sutherland Cup quarter-final to Hamilton Mountain Bees 4-games-to-2
1969–70 Won Eastern Jr. B championshipLost Sutherland Cup semi-final to Hamilton Mountain Bees 4-games-to-3
OPJHL Era
1972–73 Did not qualify.
OHL Era
1973–74 Out of playoffs.
1974–75 Lost to Toronto Marlboros in quarter-finals 9 points to 7.
1975–76 Lost to Ottawa 67's in quarter-finals 9 points to 5.
1976–77 Defeated Sudbury Wolves in quarter-finals 9 points to 3. Lost to Ottawa 67's in semi-finals 9 points to 7.
1977–78 Lost to S.S.Marie Greyhounds in first round 6 points to 4.
1978–79 Defeated Ottawa 67's in first round 6 points to 2. Lost to Peterborough Petes in quarter-finals 9 points to 5.
1979–80 Lost to Sudbury Wolves in first round 3 games to 0.
1980–81 Defeated Ottawa 67's in division semi-finals 9 points to 5. Lost to S.S. Marie Greyhounds in division finals 9 points to 5.
1981–82 Lost to Peterborough Petes in first round 6 points to 2.
1982–83 Out of playoffs.
1983–84 Out of playoffs.
1984–85 Out of playoffs.
1985–86 Defeated Oshawa Generals in first round 8 points to 4. Finished 3rd place in round-robin versus Peterborough Petes and Belleville Bulls, and are eliminated.
1986–87 Defeated Belleville Bulls in first round 4 games to 2. Lost to Oshawa Generals in quarter-finals 4 games to 2.
1987–88 Out of playoffs.
1988–89 Out of playoffs.
1989–90 Lost to Belleville Bulls 4 games to 3 in first round.
1990–91 Out of playoffs.
1991–92 Out of playoffs.
1992–93 Defeated North Bay Centennials 4 games to 1 in first round. Defeated Oshawa Generals 4 games to 2 in quarter-finals. Lost to Peterborough Petes 4 games to 1 in semi-finals.
1993–94 Lost to Belleville Bulls 4 games to 2 in division quarter-finals.
1994–95 Lost to Belleville Bulls 4 games to 2 in conference quarter-finals.
1995–96 Lost to Peterborough Petes 4 games to 1 in division quarter-finals.
1996–97 Lost to Peterborough Petes 4 games to 1 in division quarter-finals.
1997–98 Defeated Oshawa Generals 4 games to 3 in division quarter-finals. Lost to London Knights 4 games to 1 in quarter-finals.
1998–99 Lost to Barrie Colts 4 games to 1 in conference quarter-finals.
1999–2000 Lost to Sudbury Wolves 4 games to 1 in conference quarter-finals.
2000–01 Lost to Belleville Bulls 4 games to 0 in conference quarter-finals.
2001–02 Out of playoffs. (Lost to North Bay Centennials 6 to 2 in 8th place tie-breaker game.)
2002–03 Out of playoffs.
2003–04 Lost to Barrie Colts 4 games to 1 in conference quarter-finals.
2004–05 Out of playoffs.
2005–06 Lost to Sudbury Wolves 4 games to 2 in conference quarter-finals.
2006–07 Lost to Oshawa Generals 4 games to 1 in conference quarter-finals.
2007–08 Out of playoffs.
2008–09 Out of playoffs.
2009–10 Lost to Brampton Battalion 4 games to 3 in conference quarter-finals.
2010–11 Lost to Oshawa Generals 4 games to 1 in conference quarter-finals.
2011–12 Out of playoffs.
2012–13 Lost to Barrie Colts 4 games to 0 in conference quarter-finals.
2013–14 Lost to Peterborough Petes 4 games to 3 in conference quarter-finals.
2014–15 Lost to North Bay Battalion 4 games to 0 in conference quarter-finals.
2015-16 Defeated Oshawa Generals 4 games to 1 in conference quarter-finals.  Lost to Niagara IceDogs 4 games to 0 in conference semi-finals.
2016-17 Defeated Hamilton Bulldogs 4 games to 3 in conference quarter-finals.  Lost to Peterborough Petes 4 games to 0 in conference semi-finals.
2017-18 Defeated North Bay Battalion 4 games to 1 in conference quarter-finals.  Defeated Barrie Colts 4 games to 2 in conference semi-finals.  Lost to Hamilton Bulldogs 4 games to 1 in conference finals.
2018–19 Out of playoffs.
2019–20 Cancelled.
2020–21 Cancelled.
2021-22 Defeated Oshawa Generals 4 games to 2 in conference quarter-finals.  Lost to North Bay Battalion 4 games to 1 in conference semi-finals.

Team uniforms and logos

The original uniforms and logos of the OHL Frontenacs were revived from the EPHL franchise, which was affiliated with the Boston Bruins. The logo featured a yellow letter 'K' with a black outline, surrounded by black spokes leading to a yellow circle border with the name Kingston Frontenacs in black.

In 2002, the team adopted a new logo with a stylized Count Frontenac. The jerseys feature a star striping pattern similar to Dallas of the NHL, and a modified version of the former "K" logo is used on the shoulder.

In 2007, the Frontenacs unveiled a 3rd jersey, which was black, yellow and white, and very similar looking to the Boston Bruins jerseys from the early 1970s. The "K" logo was used on the front of the jersey.  The Frontenacs began wearing these jerseys on February 22, 2008, which was the same night that they opened their new arena.

In 2008, The Frontenacs unveiled a new 3rd jersey which was worn at home between opening night and New Years barring 2 games where the black star jersey was worn. The  was a white version of the black alternate which was worn for the second half of the season.

In 2009, the Frontenacs, along with all CHL teams unveiled new uniforms using RBK EDGE templates. In 2012, the Frontenacs began wearing a newly designed set of uniforms featuring a large K as a logo.

Arenas
The former home arena of the Frontenacs was the Kingston Memorial Centre, with a seating capacity 3,079 seated, and 3,300 including standing room. Built in 1950, its ice size has unique dimensions of 200' x 92'. The Frontenacs' final game was played at the Memorial Center on February 15, 2008, a 6–4 win over the London Knights. Kyle Paige scored the final goal ever at the Memorial Centre.

The Kingston Frontenacs began play at their new downtown arena, Leon's Centre (then K-Rock Centre) on February 22, 2008, in a 3–2 loss to the Belleville Bulls. The Frontenacs' first win at the Leon's Centre came on February 24, 2008 when they defeated the Peterborough Petes by a score of 7–4.

See also
List of ice hockey teams in Ontario

References

External links
 

Ice hockey clubs established in 1989
Ontario Hockey League teams
Sport in Kingston, Ontario
1989 establishments in Ontario